"You Know What It Is" is a song by American hip hop recording artist T.I., released July 10, 2007, as the second single from his fifth studio album T.I. vs. T.I.P. (2007). The song was produced by Jerry "Wonda" Duplessis and Wyclef Jean, the latter of whom contributes vocals throughout the hip hop track. The single peaked at number 34 on the US Billboard Hot 100.

Music video
The song's music video was filmed in Miami, by director and friend Chris Robinson. On June 12, the video was made available on iTunes. The video premiered MTV's TRL on June 14, 2007. The video features cameo appearances from B.G., Kymani Marley, and P$C.

Chart performance
"You Know What It Is" debuted at number 73 on the US Hot R&B/Hip Hop Songs on the chart dated June 28, 2007. The song later managed to peak at number 11. On the chart dated July 21, 2007, the single debuted at number 68 on the US Billboard Hot 100. The song eventually peaked at number 34 on the chart and spent a total of 18 weeks.

Track listing

Promo CD single
 "You Know What It Is" (Clean Version)
 "You Know What It Is" (Dirty Version)
 "You Know What It Is" (Instrumental)

Vinyl single
"You Know What It Is" (Radio Version)
"You Know What It Is" (Amended Version)
"You Know What It Is" (Instrumental)
"You Know What It Is" (Explicit version)
"You Know What It Is" (Acapella)

Charts

Weekly charts

Year-end charts

References

External links
Video shooting in Miami.
"You Know What It Is" on VH1 confirmed by T.I.
Sneak Peek from video "You Know What It Is".
"You Know What It Is" Lyrics

2007 singles
Grand Hustle Records singles
Music videos directed by Chris Robinson (director)
T.I. songs
Wyclef Jean songs
Songs written by Wyclef Jean
Songs written by Jerry Duplessis
Song recordings produced by Jerry Duplessis
Songs written by T.I.
Song recordings produced by Wyclef Jean
2007 songs
Atlantic Records singles